Kenneth McNeill, MD, MP (1918 – 2001), was a Jamaican political figure and a renowned surgeon. He died at the age of 83 in Jamaica. He is the father of five children including present politician Wykeham McNeill.

Political career
He first entered Parliament as a Senator in 1962, and between 1969 and 1977 served as Member of Parliament for East Central St. Andrew, and then for the Northwest St. Andrew constituency. He held several ministries including Health and Environmental Control, the Public Service and Minister of Parliamentary Affairs.

Awards 
In 1977 he was awarded the Order of Jamaica for his public service.

Death 
The political community including members of the House of Representatives were shocked when Deputy House Leader Terry Gillette announced his death and a number of tributes ensued.
"Prime Minister P.J. Patterson said he had a feeling of profound loss on hearing the news. He said Dr. McNeill had come from a family that had made substantial contribution to the country."

References

External links
 Calvin Bowen, "Remembering Ken McNeill - An outstanding son of Jamaica", Jamaica Gleaner, 14 December 2001.

Members of the House of Representatives of Jamaica
Ministers of Health of Jamaica
Members of the Order of Jamaica
1918 births
2001 deaths